Samsen or spelled Sam Sen is a road and neighbourhood in Bangkok considered to be one of Bangkok's oldest. Samsen road starts from Bang Lamphu intersection in the area of Bang Lamphu  within Phra Nakhon district and wends northeast to Dusit district as far as it ends at Kiakkai intersection, covering 4.6 km (2.8 mi). It runs parallel to east Chao Phraya river all the route.

History 
Samsen began in Ayutthaya period (1351–1767) in the reign of King Narai (1633–88). Portuguese came to live and work in the kingdom and the king allowed them to settle in Samsen. At that time, this area was a paddy field and canal by Khlong Samsen (Samsen canal), which is believed to be a natural canal. The Portuguese founded Immaculate Conception Church in around 1674, the oldest church in Thailand.

In the reigns of King Phutthayotfa Chulalok (Rama I) and King Nangklao (Rama III) of Rattanakosin kingdom, Christians Khmers and Annamese (Vietnamese) who escaped crackdowns in their country migrated to Siam (now Thailand). They were allowed by the king to settle in the area nearby Portuguese's church in Samsen. The area became known as "Ban Khmer" (บ้านเขมร) and "Ban Yuan" (บ้านญวน).

Samsen has at least two Thai temples, which date to the Ayutthaya period or earlier, including Wat Rachathiwat and Wat Thewarat Kunchorn.

In the past, the area of Samsen to Pak Kret in Nonthaburi used to be a place where abundance of toli shad (Tenualosa toli) was found. They will swim from the sea to spawn in freshwater sources on the Chao Phraya river in Bangkok area to the north. Therefore, they are fished in large numbers and causing to be in an endangered state at present.

Etymology 
"Samsen" has no specific meaning in Thai. It may have derived from Pali or from Bahasa Melayu. Legendarily a floating Buddha statue required up to three hundred thousand people to raise it from the water. "Samsen" is similar to "Sam Saen", which means three hundred thousand. This Buddha is a Buddha statue in stopping the rainstorm attitude enshrined in front of Samsen Police Station today, namely Luang Por Phuttha Samsen, or known in short as Luang Por Samsen.

Two related sub-districts are Samsen Nai in Phaya Thai and Samsen Nok in Huai Khwang districts. They are connected to Khlong Samsen rather than the road.

Road 
Although it is short, Samsen road runs through historic and important places such as Bang Khun Phrom Palace and Bank of Thailand with Thewawes Palace, Thewet Bridge, Immaculate Conception Church, Saint Francis Xavier Church, Saint Gabriel's College, Vajira Hospital, Suan Sunandha Rajabhat University, Sukhothai Palace, National Library and Royal Pier, Thavasuki, Wat Bot Samsen, Boon Rawd Brewery Headquarters and Sappaya-Sapasathan, the new Parliament House.

The road also a location of five piers for Chao Phraya Express Boat: Thewet (N15), Payap (N18), Irrigation Dept. (N19), Kheaw Khai Ka (N20), and Kiak Kai (N21).

In addition, at the point that it intersects with Ratchawithi road (Sang Hi intersection) near the Krungthon Bridge (Sang Hi Bridge) on Ratchawithi road is also the location of the San Chao Mae Thapthim Samsen, a Chinese shrine of Shui Wei Sheng Niang, goddess of the sea according to the belief of Hainanese since ancient times, similar to Mazu. It is considered to be her oldest shrine in Bangkok, believed to have been built since the reign of King Nangklao.

Samsen road is also the administrative boundary line in the following khwaengs (sub-districts):
Chana Songkhram (left) and Talat Yot (right) in Phra Nakhon district from Bang Lamphu intersection to Nararat Sathan bridge
 Wat Sam Phraya (left) and Ban Phan Thom (right) in Phra Nakhon district from the Nararat Sathan bridge to Bang Khun Phrom intersection
 Wat Sam Phraya (left) and Bang Khun Phrom (right) in Phra Nakhon district, from Bang Khun Phrom intersection to Thewet Naruemit bridge
 Wachiraphayaban (left) and Dusit (right) in Dusit district, from the Thewet Naruemit to Sophon bridges

References 

Phra Nakhon district
Dusit district
Neighbourhoods of Bangkok
Streets in Bangkok
Populated places on the Chao Phraya River
Buildings and structures on the Chao Phraya River